Hugo Miranda (born 6 December 1929) was a Chilean cyclist. He competed in the individual and team road race events at the 1952 Summer Olympics.

References

External links
 

1929 births
Year of death missing
Chilean male cyclists
Olympic cyclists of Chile
Cyclists at the 1952 Summer Olympics